Nagaraj Kote is an Indian actor in the Kannada film industry, and a theatre artist in Karnataka, India.

Award(s)

Personal life
Kote was the eldest among four children. His father was Javarappa and mother Rangamma. He is married and has two sons.

Career
Kote started his acting career in TV serial/soap Sankranti, directed by his mentor T. S. Nagabharana. Kote's theater play Nele, whose message was on importance of trees, entered Limca Book of Records. Kote has an acting career spanning 30 years in cinema.

Selected filmography
 Baanaadi (2014) (Director, writer, screenplay)
 Jagath Kiladi (1998)
 Jayammana Maga (2013)
 Haalu Thuppa (2017)

References

External links

Male actors in Kannada cinema
Indian male film actors
Male actors from Karnataka
20th-century Indian male actors
21st-century Indian male actors
Male actors in Kannada theatre
Living people
Kannada people
Male actors in Kannada television
1965 births